Hundvåko or Hundvåkøy is an island in Austevoll municipality in Vestland county, Norway. The  island lies southeast of the island of Stora Kalsøy and northwest of the large island of Huftarøy. There are bridge connections to both of those islands.

The main population centres on Hundvåko are the villages of Austevollshella and Toranger. The island has a population (in 2001) of 554 inhabitants.

The island is rocky and barren with few forested areas and much heathland. There are flocks of wild spælsau sheep that live year-round on the island in the heathland. This breed of sheep has roamed on the island since Viking times.

See also
List of islands of Norway

References

Islands of Vestland
Austevoll